sonaBLAST! Records is a Louisville, Kentucky-based independent record label founded by film producer Gill Holland in 2002.

Artist roster
 
 Andrew T. Hunt
 Bastion
 Beady
 Belushi Speed Ball
 Ben Arthur (musician)
 Ben Sollee
 Blair Gun
 Broken Chord
 Builder of The House
 Block
 Builder of the House
 Carousel Beach
 Ceiri Torjussen
 Cheyenne Marie Mize
 Chives
 Collider
 Corrina Repp
 Et Tu Brucé
 GRLwood
 Heidi Howe
 Hoots And Hellmouth
 Jack Harlow
 James Lindsey
 Jamie Barnes
 Jaxon Lee Swain
 Joel Henderson
 John Grover
 Jonathan Glen Wood
 Justin Paul Lewis
 Kelley McRae
 Kyle James Hauser
 Leigh Ann Yost
 Love Jones
 Lucky Pineapple
 Mark Geary
 Max Gabriel
 Michael Whitis
 Mickey Clark
 Misha Feigin
 Nerves Junior
 Peter Searcy
 Phourist & The Photons
 Pleaser
 Quiet Hollers
 Roy Ruiz Clayton
 Shannon Brackett
 Teddy Abrams ft. Jim James
  Ted Stevens
 Teneia Sanders
 The Broken Spurs
 The Debauchees
 The Fervor
 The Instruction
 The Old Ceremony
 The Pass 
 The Seedy Seeds
 The Veldt
 Tim Krekel
 WOKE
 Workers

Soundtracks and compilations
 Loggerheads (2005)
 Mentor (2006)
 The War Boys (2009)
 The Catechism Cataclysm (2011)
 Steamboat Songs](2014)
 Maidentrip  Original Score Composed by Ben Sollee (2014)
 From Baghdad to Brooklyn Original Score Composed by Max Gabriel (2015)
 Lazy Eye (2016)
 The Big Sick (2017)

See also 
List of Record Labels

References

External links
 

American independent record labels
Record labels established in 2002
2002 establishments in Kentucky
Companies based in Louisville, Kentucky
American companies established in 2002